The Nintendo Switch is a video game console developed by Nintendo, for which games are released both in physical and digital formats. Physical games are sold on cartridges that slot into the Switch console unit. Digital games are purchased through the Nintendo eShop and stored either in the Switch's internal 32 GB of storage (64 GB in the OLED version) or on a microSDXC card. The Switch has no regional lockout features, freely allowing games from any region to be played on any system, with the exception of Chinese game cards released by Tencent that play only on consoles distributed by Tencent.

Switch games are listed across five pages due to technical limitations. There are currently  games across these five lists:
 List of Nintendo Switch games (0–9 and A)
 List of Nintendo Switch games (B)
 List of Nintendo Switch games (C–G)
 List of Nintendo Switch games (H–P)
 List of Nintendo Switch games (Q–Z)

Not included in the main list are:
 Nintendo Switch Online games
 Arcade Archives games
 Sega Ages games
 G-Mode Archives games

Other related lists include:
 List of best-selling Nintendo Switch video games
 List of cancelled Nintendo Switch games

References

Switch
Video game lists by platform